Jozef Valkučák (born 10 July 1966) is a retired Slovak football midfielder.

References

1966 births
Living people
Slovak footballers
FK Dukla Banská Bystrica players
ŠK Futura Humenné players
1. FC Tatran Prešov players
BV Cloppenburg players
Association football midfielders
Slovak expatriate footballers
Expatriate footballers in Germany
Slovak expatriate sportspeople in Germany